The Arabic-language journal al-Ahali (Arabic: الأهالي; DMG: al-Ahālī; English: "The People") was published between 1894 and 1895 by Ismaʿil Abaza in Cairo. Abaza defined the objective of the journal as "notifying the government of the people's wishes, desires, complaints of misdeeds and grievances". Like the journal Al-Muqattam, it focused on serving the government by conveying its message to the people.

References

1894 establishments in Egypt
1895 disestablishments in Egypt
Arabic-language magazines
Defunct literary magazines published in Egypt
Defunct political magazines published in Egypt
Magazines established in 1894
Magazines disestablished in 1895
Magazines published in Cairo